HSC Tallink AutoExpress 2 was a fast passenger ferry (catamaran) operated by the Venezuelan ferry company Conferry on the line between Puerto la Cruz and Punta de Piedras, Margarita Island.

History
HSC Boomerang was built in 1997 by Austal in Australia and owned by Sea Tropid Co. Ltd. (Polferries). The vessel is of the AutoExpress 82-type designed by Austal. In 2001 the ship was bought by Tallink and renamed Tallink AutoExpress 2, operating between Tallinn, Estonia, and Helsinki, Finland.  On October 12, 2007, the ship collided with HSC SuperSeaCat Three in Tallinn Harbour, resulting a meter-long hole in the ship's side. No passengers were harmed in the incident. After that, the vessel was chartered to Conferry, a ferry operator in Venezuela. On November 3, the vessel arrived at the premises of Curaçao Drydock, after being delivered by Redwise. It was bought by Conferry in 2009. On August 6, 2018 it has partially sunk due to a lack of proper maintenance, abandoned in the port of Guanta, Venezuela. It was no longer operational from about 2017 due to lack of funds caused by economic crisis in Venezuela.

References

Ships built by Austal
Ferries of Poland
Ferries of Estonia
Ships of Venezuela
1997 ships